Bluegrass or Blue Grass may refer to:

Plants 
 Bluegrass (grass), several species of grasses of the genus Poa
Kentucky bluegrass (Poa pratensis), one well-known species of the genus

Arts and media 
Bluegrass music, a form of American roots music
Bluegrass (Sirius), a bluegrass music satellite radio channel
Bluegrass Films, an independent film studio based in Los Angeles

Places 
Blue Grass, Iowa, a city in the United States
Blue Grass, Minnesota, an unincorporated settlement in the United States
Blue Grass, Virginia, an unincorporated settlement in the United States
Bluegrass region, a geographic region in the US state of Kentucky
Blue Grass Airport, an airport in Fayette county, Kentucky

Other uses 
Blue Grass, a 1915 film with Thomas A. Wise
Blue Grass Army Depot, a munitions storage depot in Richmond, Kentucky
 Blue Grass, a brand name used by Belknap Hardware and Manufacturing Company
Bluegrass, a passenger train of the Monon Railroad

See also